Hernstein is a town in Lower Austria, Austria in the district of Baden bei Wien.

Municipal divisions
The market municipality of Hernstein has seven Katastralgemeinden: 
Grillenberg 
Hernstein 
Alkersdorf (district) 
Aigen (district) 
Kleinfeld 
Neusiedl bei Grillenberg 
Pöllau 
Steinhof 
Veitsau

(In contrast the districts of Steinhof und Veitsau are almost in the neighboring community of Berndorf)

Population

References

External links
Official homepage

Cities and towns in Baden District, Austria